Ripcord is the ninth studio album by New Zealand-born Australian country music singer Keith Urban. It was released on 6 May 2016 via Hit Red and Capitol Records Nashville. The album produced the singles "John Cougar, John Deere, John 3:16"; "Break on Me", "Wasted Time", "Blue Ain't Your Color", and "The Fighter". It also features musical artists Nile Rodgers, Pitbull, and Carrie Underwood. Just like his previous album Fuse (2013), Urban co-worked with multiple producers on this one.

The album was nominated for Best Country Album at the 59th Annual Grammy Awards. On 7 April 2017, the album was certified Platinum by the RIAA.

Background
This album has been called Urban's most experimental album to date. Urban told Rolling Stone, "It was a lot of searching, a lot of experimenting, and when you get to work with as many people as I did, you end up with a lot of stuff."

One of the tracks, "Sun Don't Let Me Down" features Pitbull, and Nile Rodgers on guitar. The first verse in that song makes reference to Urban's wife Nicole Kidman's 1995 film To Die For.

Promotion
Urban promoted the album by performing "Wasted Time" on The Tonight Show starring Jimmy Fallon on 6 May and on The Ellen DeGeneres Show on 12 May 2016. Three days after the album was released Urban played a free lunchtime concert in front of the Bridgestone Arena in Nashville on 9 May 2016. He performed tracks from Ripcord such as "Gone Tomorrow (Here Today)" and "Blue Ain't Your Color". Urban embarked on a world tour in support of the album on the RipCORD World Tour, beginning on 2 June 2016.

Singles
The album's lead single "John Cougar, John Deere, John 3:16" was released on June 9, 2015. It reached number forty on the US Hot 100 and number two on both the Hot Country Songs and Country Airplay charts. The song was nominated for Best Country Solo Performance at the 58th Annual Grammy Awards but lost to Chris Stapleton's "Traveler".

The second single "Break on Me" was released on October 23, 2015. It reached number one on the Country Airplay chart and peaked at number six on Hot Country Songs, as well as number 54 on the Hot 100.

"Wasted Time" was released as the third single on April 4, 2016. Like its predecessor, it also reached number one on Country Airplay chart. In addition, it peaked at number four on Hot Country Songs and at number 51 on the Hot 100.

"Blue Ain't Your Color" was released on July 30, 2016 as the album's fourth single by Urban via Snapchat. The song reached number one on both the Hot Country Songs and Country Airplay charts. Also, it reached number 24 on Hot 100.

"The Fighter", a duet with fellow country musician Carrie Underwood, was released as the album's fifth single on February 6, 2017. Urban wrote the song with his producer busbee while the two were in London. It was inspired by conversations that Urban had with his wife Nicole Kidman early in their relationship. It peaked at number two on both the Hot Country Songs and Country Airplay chart. It also reached number 38 on the Hot 100 chart.

Critical reception

Ripcord has received generally positive reviews from music critics. On Metacritic — which assigns a normalized rating out of 100 to reviews from mainstream critics, the album received an average score of 72 based on 4 reviews, indicating "generally favorable reviews". ABC News Allan Raible says that the album "is not really a country record" but rather "...more of an electric-pop influenced record," saying that it "[also] reeks of formula but at the same time, there's something enjoyably adventurous about this record." At The Sydney Morning Herald, the album received three stars and reports that "Urban threads a tight needle, updating the slick contemporary American country sound he, long ago, mastered with the warm washes and bright punctuation of pop music," adding that "[i]t is, at first suggestion, an almost ludicrous concept, but it's testament to Urban's craftsmanship that the record is dexterous and pleasing."

Sounds Like Nashville described the album as "a remarkably diverse album that pushes boundaries and furthers Urban’s evolution as an artist."

For the collaborations on the album, The News-Sentinels Michael McCall describes "The Fighter", the duet with Carrie Underwood, as "a modern update of Marvin Gaye and Tammi Terrell", and views the collaboration with Pitbull and Nile Rodgers ("Sun Don't Let Me Down") as something "more like an exercise [rather] than a celebration".

Accolades
The album received a nomination for Album of the Year both at the 50th Annual Country Music Association Awards and 52nd Academy of Country Music Awards. It was also nominated for Best Country Album at the 59th Grammy Awards.

Commercial performance
Ripcord debuted at number one in Urban's home country of Australia, and at number 21 in New Zealand. It stayed at number one on the Australian albums chart for a second week, becoming his first album to spend more than one week at the top of that chart. The album was certified Platinum in Australia for shipments of over 70,000 units.

The CD debuted at number 3 on the Canadian Albums chart and was certified Gold for shipments of over 40,000 units.

In the US, it debuted at number one on the Billboards Top Country Albums chart, becoming Urban's fifth number one album on that chart. The disc also debuted at No. 4 on Billboard 200, earning over 106,000 album-equivalent units (93,000 pure sales) during its first week. The album remained at number one on the Top Country Albums chart for a second week. On April 7, 2017, the album was certified Platinum by the RIAA. As of June 2018, it has sold over 740,700 copies in the United States.

Track listing

Personnel
Adapted from AllMusic and Ripcord liner notes.

"Gone Tomorrow (Here Today)"
Jeff Bhasker – piano, keyboards, programming, background vocals
James Gadson – drums
Tyler Johnson – programming, keyboards, background vocals
Keith Urban – vocals, electric guitar, ganjo, EBow

"John Cougar, John Deere, John 316"
Matt Chamberlain – drums, programming
Ross Copperman – gang vocals
Jerry Flowers – background vocals
Dann Huff – acoustic guitar, gang vocals
Charlie Judge – keyboards
Andy Snyder – gang vocals
Russell Terrell – background vocals
Keith Urban – bass guitar, acoustic guitar, electric guitar, vocals
Jonathan Yudkin – violin

"Wasted Time"
 James Abrahart – background vocals
 Greg Wells – piano, keyboards, programming
 Keith Urban – acoustic guitar, electric guitar, ganjo

"Habit of You"
 Matt Chamberlain – drums
 Charlie Judge – keyboards
 K-KOV – programming, background vocals
 Pino Palladino – bass guitar
 Keith Urban – electric guitar, ganjo, Ebow

"Sun Don't Let Me Down"
 Shanika Bereal – background vocals
 busbee – bass guitar, programming, keyboards, background vocals
 Eric Darken – percussion
 Russell Graham – programming, keyboards
 Samantha Nelson – background vocals
 Pino Palladino – bass guitar
 Tiffany Palmer – background vocals
 Pitbull – rapping
 Nile Rodgers – electric guitar, whistling
 Aaron Sterling – drums
 Keith Urban – electric guitar, ganjo, vocals

"Gettin' in the Way"
 Nathan Barlowe – programming
 Matt Chamberlain – programming
 Dann Huff – electric guitar, keyboards
 Charlie Judge – synthesizer
 Pino Palladino – bass guitar
 Russell Terrell – background vocals
 Keith Urban – electric guitar, acoustic guitar, mandolin, vocals

"Blue Ain't Your Color"
 Matt Chamberlain – drums, programming
 Dann Huff – acoustic guitar
 Charlie Judge – keyboards, synthesizer
 Pino Palladino – bass guitar
 Russell Terrell – background vocals
 Keith Urban – acoustic guitar, electric guitar, nylon-string guitar, vocals

"The Fighter"
 busbee – bass guitar, keyboards, electric guitar, programming
 Carrie Underwood – vocals
 Keith Urban – acoustic guitar, electric guitar, mandolin, ganjo, vocals

"Break on Me"
 Matt Chamberlain – programming
 Nathan Chapman – programming, keyboards, background vocals
 Charlie Judge – keyboards
 Russell Terrell – background vocals
 Keith Urban – acoustic guitar, electric guitar, vocals
 Tal Wilkenfeld – bass guitar

"Boy Gets a Truck"
 Matt Chamberlain – drums, programming
 Dann Huff – electric guitar, synthesizer
 Charlie Judge – keyboards, synthesizer
 Pino Palladino – bass guitar
 Russell Terrell – background vocals
 Keith Urban – electric guitar, vocals

"Your Body"
 busbee – keyboards, bass guitar, programming, electric guitar, background vocals
 Russell Terrell – background vocals
 Keith Urban – ganjo, mandolin, acoustic guitar, electric guitar, vocals

"That Could Still Be Us"
 Jonny Price – programming, synthesizers, keyboards

"Worry 'Bout Nothin'"
 Nathan Barlowe – programming, synthesizer
 Matt Chamberlain – drums, programming
 Dann Huff – electric guitar
 Charlie Judge – keyboards, synthesizer
 Pino Palladino – bass guitar
 Russell Terrell – background vocals
 Keith Urban – electric guitar, acoustic guitar, ganjo, Ebow

Production
Assistants – Josh Ditty, John Edwards, Justin Fisher, Chris Galland, Nik Karpen, Seth Morton, Mike Stankiewicz
Editing – Dave Clauss, Sean Neff
Engineer – Joe Baldridge, Jeff Bhasker, Dave Clauss, Dann Huff, Tyler Johnson, Ryan Nashi, Dave O'Donnell, Jonny Price, Brandon Schexnayder, Greg Wells
Assistant engineers – Tyler Sheilds 
Mixer – Serban Ghenea, Chris Lord-Alge, Manny Marroquin, Tony Maserati, Justin Niebank
Mixing engineer – John Hanes, Nik Karpen
Producers – Jeff Bhasker, busbee, Nathan Chapman, Dann Huff, Nitzan Kaikov, Tyler Johnson, Jonny Price, Nile Rodgers, Keith Urban, Greg Wells
 Mastering – Tom Coyne at Sterling Sound

Charts

Weekly charts

Year-end charts

Decade-end charts

Certifications and sales

Release history

See also
 List of number-one albums of 2016 (Australia)
 List of number-one country albums of 2016 (Australia)

References

2016 albums

Albums recorded at EastWest Studios
Capitol Records albums
Keith Urban albums